Amaranka is a rural locality (a selo) and the administrative center of Amaransky Selsoviet of Romnensky District, Amur Oblast, Russia. The population was 244 as of 2018. There are 9 streets.

Geography 
Amaranka is located 32 km southeast of Romny (the district's administrative centre) by road. Vostochnaya Niva is the nearest rural locality.

References 

Rural localities in Romnensky District